Tiger Lily Road is a 2013 American comedy film written and directed by Michael Medeiros and starring Ilvi Dulack, Tom Pelphrey and Karen Chamberlain.

Cast
Ilvi Dulack as Annie McCann
Karen Chamberlain as Louise Friedkin
Tom Pelphrey as Rocky Harden
Tom Nardini as Russell Chambers 
Rita Gardner as Betty McCann
Sarah Shaefer as Sandy

References

External links
 
 

American comedy films
2010s English-language films
2010s American films